Yogendra Tiku (born 25 July) is an Indian film, television and stage actor, born and brought up at Prayagraj. He has been successful in entertainment industries including theater plays, TV serials and Bollywood movies, like No One Killed Jessica (2011), Queen (2014), Neerja, Parmanu: The Story of Pokhran etc.

Career
Tiku has been involved with theatre since childhood. His acting career began with the theatre group "Prayag Rang Manch" of Allahabad, and he then had roles in productions such as Bahut Bada Sawaal, Panchi Aise Aate Hain, Khamosh Adalat Jari Hai, and Andher Nagri Chaupat Raja. He then moved to Nairobi for eight years, acting in many Hindi, Punjabi and Gujarati plays.

While in Nairobi he joined a professional English theatre group called Phoenix Players and with them acted in productions such as The Taming of the Shrew, Moon On The Rainbow Shawl and The Noble Spaniard. After coming back from Nairobi, He did plays like Omar Khayyam, with DAT, and later plays like ILA, Rang Bhoomi etc.

Music
He attended Gandharva Maha Vidyalaya of Ahmedabad and learned Indian classical music, under the guidance of a famous guru and singer Smt. Saroj Gundani. It added advantages to grow his career in singing. He had sung many jingles in Indian as well as in Swahili language. He also composed many jingles for various products.

Radio acting
Tiku is an "A" grade Drama Voice of All India Radio (AIR). He has acted in various plays broadcast by AIR, and continues to do so.

Modeling
He also did modeling for companies like Max New York Life Insurance, Maruti Suzuki, Tata Indicom Walky, Bharat Matrimony, Britannia Milk Products, Fortune Rice Bran Oil,  Coca-Cola, Amazon etc. These TV commercials can be seen on YouTube.

Writer and director
Plays directed by Tiku include:
Pappa Ko Ho Gaya Pyar
Paisa Paisa Paisa
Shakuntala... written and directed
Mahavir... written and directed
Beeswin Sadi Mein Kahin... Written for AIR
Gandhi... Written for AIR

Filmography

Actor
English August (1994)
Everybody Says I'm Fine! (2001)
No One Killed Jessica (2011)
Losing Gemma
Dabangg 2
Bajatey Raho (2013)
Queen (2014)
Ankhon Dekhi (2014)
Neerja (2016)
Fan(2016)
Brij Mohan Amar Rahe  ( Netflix )
Parmanu: The Story of Pokhran (2018)
Zoya Factor. (cameo )
Chaman Bahar 2020 ( Netflix )

 Television

● Rangbaz (Web series ) Zee5

● Home Sweet Office (Web series on YouTube)

Love Ka Hai Intezaar
Bas Itna Sa Khwab Hai
Shadow On The Sun
One Day In Bhopal

References

External links
 
 

1953 births
Living people
Male actors from Allahabad
Indian male film actors
Male actors in Hindi cinema
Indian male stage actors
Indian male television actors
Indian male voice actors